Evite is a social-planning website for creating, sending, and managing online invitations. The website offers digital invitations with RSVP tracking. They also offer greeting cards, announcements, eGift cards, and party planning ideas.

Evite was launched in 1998 by co-founders Al Lieb and Selina Tobaccowala. Since 2020, private investors have owned Evite after two decades of ownership under media conglomerates.

Usage 
Evite is primarily used as an event planning platform, offering free and Premium (paid) invitations to its 160 million annual users. Hosts can choose from thousands of digital invitations or cards, customize their choice, and send their invitations/cards via email, text or social media. Planning and gifting options (including registries) are available to add right on the invitation, and hosts and guests can message each other with updates.

Legal controversy 

In 2007, Evite threatened to sue San Francisco-based startup and competitor Socializr (later acquired by Punchbowl.com) due to alleged copyright infringement.

Data breach 
In July 2019, Evite data was spotted for sale online. Evite admitted that their systems were compromised and data of over 100 million accounts were stolen. According to Evite, the breach did not contain "user information more recent than 2013". The stolen data included users' real names, usernames, email addresses, passwords, dates of birth, phone numbers, and mailing addresses. Evite recommended users to change their passwords on Evite (but did not require them to do so). Also, since Evite stored plaintext passwords (not password hashes), if passwords were reused elsewhere, those accounts could be vulnerable to credential stuffing attacks.

Popular culture references 
 The Simpsons: The character "Snake" responded to a fellow inmate who was unaware of an impending jailbreak: "I sent you an Evite. You never responded. Nice netiquette, jerk!"
 Alias: In season 4, episode 3 Jack crashes a birthday party thrown for Weiss and comments on his lack of an invitation: "Unless it was an Evite. I don't read Evites."
 The Office: In "Email Surveillance", Jim Halpert sends Evites to his coworkers to a barbecue at his house, excluding regional manager Michael Scott from the guest list. "Wonder where my eVitation is?" Scott ponders aloud. In season 5, Michael creates his own paper company in the same building as the Dunder Mifflin Scranton Branch. He sends out an Evite for their pancake luncheon.
 Family Guy: episode "You Can't Do That on Television, Peter", criticized Evite in a cutaway gag.

References

External links
 

IAC (company)
Online companies of the United States
Social planning websites
Online companies of Germany
Online companies of France
Internet properties established in 1998
2001 mergers and acquisitions
2010 mergers and acquisitions